André Jung (born May 12, 1961) is a Brazilian drummer and journalist, best known for his performances in the band Ira!. He has also been a member of Titãs, although he has released only one album (Titãs) with them. Curiously, the drummer that he replaced in Ira! (Charles Gavin) went to play with Titãs, with whom he played with until 2010. André studied journalism at the Communication and Arts School (ECA) of the University of São Paulo and writes columns for sites and newspapers.

Currently has a new band named Urban ToTem, alongside former acoustic tour members of IRA! such as Michelle Abu and Jonas Moncaio.

Discography

With Titãs 
 Titãs (1984)

With Ira!

With Urban ToTem
 Urban ToTem (2008)

External links
 Urban ToTem
 Ira! Official Website
 MundoIra! Fan Site
 Titãs Official website

1961 births
Living people
Brazilian columnists
Brazilian drummers
Brazilian rock musicians
Brazilian people of German descent
People from Recife
Titãs members
University of São Paulo alumni